Robert Sroufe is a scholar of sustainability, integrated management, high-performance buildings, supply chain management and operations. He is the Murrin Chair of Global Competitiveness at Duquesne University and the Palumbo-Donahue Graduate School of Business. His research utilizes a systemic outlook to understand the triple bottom line performance (extending TBL to the contemporary term Integrated Bottom Line (IBL)) metrics reported to internal and external stakeholders. More specifically, he focuses on what the most successful systems and tools for measuring and managing the relationship between performance and environmental, social and financial practices of businesses. His list of publications are primarily about: how firms can create productive management systems, integrate them across business functions, and measure and manage their performance; the main drivers of sustainability; the process and importance of existing buildings becoming high-performance buildings; UN Sustainable Development Goals; and the strategic change process that occurs during a firms sustainable development. His Ph.D. was conferred by Michigan State University.

Awards 
The Aspen Institute Business & Society Program awarded him with the 2017 Ideas Worth Teaching Award for his course Sustainability Tools and Processes for New Initiatives and he was also a finalist for the Aspen Institute's Faculty Pioneer Award. The Decision Sciences Institute awarded him with the Instructional Innovation Award for his Sustainability Tools and Processes for New Initiatives course. Dr. Sroufe was awarded the University Creative Teaching Award by Duquesne University. As the curriculum lead for the MBA-Sustainable Business Practices program, he was part of a faculty that awarded the Page Prize for Best U.S. Environmental Curriculum. Under the direction of Dr. Robert Sroufe, Duquesne University's MBA-Sustainable Business Practices program was ranked as the #1 Better World MBA program in the United States and #4 program in the world by Corporate Knights Magazine in 2020. His work has been featured in a number of journals including: the Journal of Operations Management, Production and Operations Management Society, the European Journal of Operations Research, Journal of Supply Chain Management, International Journal of Production Research, the Production and Inventory Management Journal, Greener Management International, and Business Strategy and the Environment. His book Integrated Management: How Sustainability Creates Value for Any Business was awarded the 2020 Responsible Research in Business and Management co-sponsored by The International Association for Chinese Management Research and the Community for Responsible Research in Business and Management. This book is used as the basis for curriculum in the top-ranked Duquesne University Duquesne University MBA-Sustainable Business Practices program. His book Developing Sustainable Supply Chains: Management Insights, Issues, and Tools co-authored by Steven A. Melnyk was awarded the Best Book Award from the Academy of Management Organizations and the Environment Division and included in Sustainable Brands Top Sustainability Books Collection.

Education and career 
He earned his Ph.D. in Operations as well as a dual M.B.A. in Materials and Logistics Management, along with Procurement from Michigan State University. He began his teaching career during his time at Michigan State University.

Before starting the MBA-Sustainable Business Practices program at Duquesne University in fall 2007, he was an assistant professor at Boston College focused on operations management. He has also held professional positions with the Department of Defense, the National Pollution Prevention Center, and has been a contracted consultant for a variety of firms.

Publications 
Books
 Sroufe, R., Stevenson, C., and Eckenrode, B., The Power of Existing Buildings: Save Money, Improve Health, and Reduce Environmental Impacts, Publisher: Island Press, 2019.
 Sroufe, R.P., Integrated Management: How Sustainability Creates Value for Any Business, Publisher: Emerald Press; 2018.
 Sroufe, R.P., and Melnyk, S.A., Developing Sustainable Supply Chains: Management Insights, Issues, and Tools: Volume I Foundations, 150 p.; 2017. Volume II Implementation, 150 p.; 2017. Publisher: Business Expert Press
 Sroufe, R.P., and Melnyk, S.A., Developing Sustainable Supply Chains: Management Insights, Issues, and Tools, 273 p., 2013.  (e-book);  (paperback) Publisher: Business Expert Press
 Sroufe, R.P., and Sarkis J., Strategic Sustainability: The State of the Art in Corporate Environmental Management Systems, Book publisher: Greenleaf Publishing, foreword by ANSI-ASQ National Accreditation Board (ANAB), October, 2007. 

Selected articles
 Sroufe, R., Hart, S., and Lovins, H., "Transforming Business Education: 21st Century Sustainable MBA Programs." Journal of Management for Global Sustainability, Vol. 9. No 1, 15-41. DOI: https://dx.doi.org/10.13185/JM2021.09102
 
 
 
 
 
 
 
 
 Sroufe, R., Gopalakrishna-Ramani, V. "Management, Social Sustainability, Reputation, and Financial Performance Relationships: An Empirical Examination of U.S. Firms", Organization & Environment, 00(0) 1-32. 2018.
 Sroufe, R. "Integration and Organizational Change towards Sustainability." Journal of Cleaner Production, 162, 315-329. 2017.
 Laszlo, C., Sroufe, R., and Waddock, S. "Torn Between Two Paradigms: A Struggle for the Soul of Business Schools" Feature Choice-Business, Schools and Communities as Agents of World Benefit: Flourishing in Challenging Times; AI Practitioner: International Journal of Appreciative Inquiry, Vol.19, No. 2, 108 – 119. 2017.
 Sroufe, R., and Ramos D., "Leveraging Collaborative, Thematic Problem-based Learning to Integrate Curricula," Decision Sciences Journal of Innovative Education, 13.2, 2015.
 Sroufe, R., Sivasubramaniam, N., Ramos, D., and Saiia, D., "Aligning the PRME: How International Study Nurtures Responsible Leadership," Journal of Management Education, December, 2014.
 Sroufe, R.P., "Life Cycle Assessment Within MBA Courses: A Tool For Integrating Sustainability" Operations Management Education Review, Vol. 7. 95-117, 2013.
 Sroufe, R.P., Ramos, D., "Best Practices in Teaching Sustainability: Live Project Courses," Decision Sciences Journal of Innovative Education, Vol. 9, No. 3, 49-369, 2011.
 Sroufe, R.P., and Curkovic, S., "An Examination of ISO 9000:2000 and Supply Chain Quality Assurance," Journal of Operations Management, Vol. 26, 503-520, 2008.
 Sroufe, R.P., Montabon, F.L., Narasimhan, R., and Wang, X., "Environmental Management Practices: a Framework," Greener Management International: the Journal of Corporate Environmental Strategy and Practice, Vol. 40, 2003.
 Sroufe, R.P, "Effects of Environmental Management Systems on Environmental Management Practices and Operations," Production and Operations Management, Volume12, Issue 3,416-432, 2003.
 Melnyk, S.A., Sroufe, R.P., and Calantone, R., "Assessing the Impact of Environmental Management Systems on Corporate and Environmental Performance," Journal of Operations Management, Vol. 21, Issue 3, 329-351, 2003. 
 Handfield, R., Walton, S.V., Sroufe, R.P., and Melnyk, S.A., "Applying Environmental Criteria to Supplier Assessment: A Study of the Application of the Analytical Hierarchy Process," European Journal of Operational Research, Volume 141, Issue 1, 70-87, 2002.
 Melnyk, S.A., Sroufe, R.P., Calantone, R., and Montabon, F.L., "Assessing the Effectiveness of U.S. Voluntary Environmental Programs: An Empirical Study," International Journal of Production Research, Volume 40, No 8, May, 2002.
 Melnyk, S.A., Sroufe, R.P., and Montabon, F.L., "How Does Management View Environmentally Responsible Manufacturing? An Empirical Study," Production and Inventory Management Journal, Vol. 42, No. 3 & 4, Third/Fourth Quarter, 2001.
 Sroufe, R.P., Curkovic, S., Montabon, F.L., and Melnyk, S.A., "The New Product Design Process and Design for the Environment: "Crossing the Chasm," International Journal of Operations and Production Management, Vol. 20, No. 2, 267-291, 2000.
 Montabon, F.L., Melnyk, S.A., Sroufe, R.P., and Calantone, R., "ISO 14000: Assessing Its Perceived Impact on Corporate Purchasing Performance," Journal of Supply Chain Management, Vol. 36, No. 2, 4-16, 1999.

References

External links 
 Duquesne University bio

Year of birth missing (living people)
Living people
Duquesne University faculty
Michigan State University alumni
Boston College faculty